Swordquest is an unfinished series of video games produced by Atari, Inc. in the 1980s.

Swordquest or Sword Quest may also refer to:

 Swordquest (board game), a 1979 board game published by Task Force Games
 Swordquest, an episode of Angry Video Game Nerd covering the unfinished series
 Sword Quest, a 2008 children's novel  by Nancy Yi Fan
 Sword Quest - a dungeons and dragons style game for the MicroBee